Maya and the Three (Spanish title: Maya y los tres) is a computer-animated fantasy streaming television miniseries created by Jorge R. Gutiérrez and produced by Tangent Animation. The nine-episode series premiered on Netflix on October 22, 2021.

Premise 
Set in a world based on pre-colonial Mesoamerica and other indigenous cultures, Maya, a warrior princess, is celebrating her fifteenth birthday, but when the underworld gods appear and announce she must pay for her family's misdeeds, everything changes. If she refuses to go along, the world itself will be ravaged by the gods, so she embarks on a quest to fulfill a prophecy that says that three warriors will appear who will help her defeat these gods and save humanity itself from destruction.

Voice cast 
 Zoe Saldaña as Princess Maya
 Gabriel Iglesias as Picchu
 Diego Luna as Zatz, the Prince of Bats
 Gael García Bernal as Lance, Dagger, and Shield, the Jaguar Brothers, Maya’s older triplet half-brothers
 Rita Moreno as Ah Puch
 Alfred Molina as Lord Mictlan, the God of War
 Allen Maldonado as Rico
 Andy Santana as Young Rico
 Stephanie Beatriz as Chimi
 Kate del Castillo as Lady Micte, the Goddess of Death and Maya’s biological mother
 Danny Trejo as Cabrakan, the God of Earthquakes
 Cheech Marin as Hura & Can, the Gods of Wind & Storms
 Rosie Perez as Cipactli, the Goddess of Alligators
 Queen Latifah as Gran Bruja, daughter of Brujo
 Wyclef Jean as Gran Brujo
 Isabela Merced as the Widow Queen
 Chelsea Rendon as Acat, the Goddess of Tattoos
 Joaquín Cosío as Camazotz, the God of Bats
 Carlos Alazraqui as Chivo, the God of Dark Magic
 Eric Bauza as Vucub, the God of Jungle Animals
 Grey Griffin as Xtabay, the Goddess of Illusions and as Bone, Goddess of Thievery, sister of Skull
 Alanna Ubach as Skull, Goddess of Thievery and sister of Bone
 Jorge R. Gutiérrez as King Teca, Maya's father
 Sandra Equihua as Queen Teca, Maya's stepmother
 John DiMaggio as Bear Killah and Barbarian King
 Carolina Ravassa as Barbarian Princess
 Dee Bradley Baker as Chiapa
 Hailey Hermida as Eagle

Production

Development 
In November 2018, it was reported that Netflix is developing an animated television miniseries about a Mesoamerican warrior. The series has Jorge Gutiérrez as the director, creator and executive producer, while Tim Yoon is a producer, Silvia Olivas and Jeff Ranjo are co-executive producers. Gutiérrez, Olivas, Doug Langdale and Candie Kelty Langdale are writers, and Ranjo is the head of story for the series. The series was described by Gutiérrez, in October 2018, as equivalent to a Mexican version of The Lord of the Rings, "but hilarious."

On September 15, 2021, Gutiérrez described an exclusive clip from the series, saying the scene was inspired by Street Fighter 2, Crouching Tiger, Hidden Dragon, Kill Bill, Ninja Scroll and a "chola fight" he saw in Tijuana, Mexico. He told Skwigly said that the series is "deeply inspired by the glorious Mesoamerican art" and Museo Nacional de Antropologia exhibits. He noted that the show's protagonist, Maya, is inspired by his mother, wife, and sister, and hinted that it would have similarities to his previous works, El Tigre and The Book of Life.

The series closed the Guadalajara Film Festival, on October 9, 2021, with the airing of two of the show's episodes at a special event.

The series was created using the open source Blender 3D animation software.

Episodes

Release 
The series was released on Netflix on October 22, 2021. Netflix described it as an "animated event told in nine epic chapters." Each episode in the limited series is 30 minutes long, comprising a total of 4 and half hours.

Reception 
On Rotten Tomatoes, the series has an approval rating of 100% based on 14 reviews, with an average rating of 8.60/10. The website's critical consensus reads, "Jorge R. Gutiérrez's joyous fantasy Maya and the Three excels thanks to a blockbuster-caliber voice cast and striking animation, delivering an adventure that will enrapture adults and kids alike."

Lovia Gyarkye, writing for The Hollywood Reporter, called every scene a "feast for the eyes" (...) adding that it " is an engaging and twisting adventure, rooted in the rich history of indigenous cultures and led by Maya, who is seeking answers about her past and trying to save her kingdom", concluding that "each episode offers opportunities to deepen our understanding of this fantastical world and to relish the visual depth of Gutiérrez’s adeptly constructed and absolutely stunning series." Cristina Escobar of Remezcla described the show as "decidedly Mexican," noted that the series is "the brainchild of Mexican/Mexican Americans," and pointed out ways that the series "honors Mexican culture," especially on ideas about death, intense imagery, tying one's love to sacrifice, the language, and uplifting indigenous people.

Accolades

Follow-up miniseries 
In May 2022, Netflix canceled its follow-up miniseries, Kung-Fu Death Punch. Originally conceived as a stand-alone feature film at the 2017 Annecy Film Festival, but transitioned to a 9-episode miniseries follow-up to Maya and the Three sometime after. Showrunner Gutiérrez stated in a tweet on Twitter that "the project is not dead. Just not moving forward at Netflix Animation."

References

External links
 
 

2021 American television series debuts
2021 American television series endings
2021 Mexican television series debuts
2021 Mexican television series endings
2020s American animated television series
2020s Mexican animated television series
American computer-animated television series
Annie Award winners
Aztecs in fiction
English-language Netflix original programming
American children's animated action television series
American children's animated adventure television series
American children's animated fantasy television series
Mexican children's animated action television series
Mexican children's animated adventure television series
Mexican children's animated fantasy television series
Mesoamerica in fiction
Mesoamerican mythology in popular culture
Netflix children's programming
Television series by Netflix Animation
Hispanic and Latino American culture
Children's and Family Emmy Award winners
Television shows scored by Gustavo Santaolalla